Methylorubrum thiocyanatum  is a facultative methylotroph bacteria from the genus Methylorubrum which has been isolated from soil around the plant Allium aflatunense in Warwickshire in the United Kingdom.

References

Further reading

External links
Type strain of Methylobacterium thiocyanatum at BacDive -  the Bacterial Diversity Metadatabase

Hyphomicrobiales
Bacteria described in 1999